Faith Mohamed Mitambo (born 29 September 1959) is a Tanzanian CCM politician and Member of Parliament for Liwale constituency since 2010.

References

1959 births
Living people
Chama Cha Mapinduzi MPs
Tanzanian MPs 2010–2015
Songea Girls Secondary School alumni